KJJK may refer to:

 KJJK (AM), a radio station (1020 AM) licensed to Fergus Falls, Minnesota, United States
 KJJK-FM, a radio station (96.5 FM) licensed to Fergus Falls, Minnesota, United States